Fareed Ahmed (born 28 April 1989, in Sialkot) is a field hockey player from Pakistan.

Career

2012
Ahmed was included in the squad for the 2012 Olympic Games in London, UK playing in all six of Pakistan's games.

See also
 Pakistan national field hockey team

References

External links

1989 births
Living people
Pakistani male field hockey players
Field hockey players at the 2012 Summer Olympics
Olympic field hockey players of Pakistan
Asian Games medalists in field hockey
Field hockey players at the 2010 Asian Games
Field hockey players at the 2014 Asian Games
Asian Games gold medalists for Pakistan
Asian Games silver medalists for Pakistan
Medalists at the 2010 Asian Games
Medalists at the 2014 Asian Games
People from Sialkot
Hockey India League players
2010 Men's Hockey World Cup players